Live at the House of Blues is a live album and video by the southern California punk rock band The Vandals, released in 2004 by Kung Fu Records and Kung Fu Films. It was the band's second official live album and video, the first being 1991's Sweatin' to the Oldies. It was released in 2 packages, one a DVD with a bonus concert CD, the other a CD with a bonus DVD. Both packages contain the same discs and material, merely packaged differently so that it could be stacked on both CD and DVD shelves. It was presented as episode 9 of Kung Fu Films' The Show Must Go Off! live concert DVD series (episode 1 had also been a live Vandals concert, from their 2001 Christmas Formal). Kung Fu Films is an offshoot of Kung Fu Records, the record label started in 1996 by Vandals members Joe Escalante and Warren Fitzgerald. Having previously worked in the television and film industries, Joe Escalante acts as director and producer for nearly all of these live DVD releases.

The performance relies heavily on material from the band's albums since 1990, when the current lineup solidified, and excludes songs from their first three releases of the 1980s. As the current lineup of the Vandals grew in popularity and recognition throughout the 1990s they began to distance themselves from the material performed by earlier incarnations of the band, of which only Escalante remains. These earlier songs tended to attract an older, more violent audience which the current lineup of the band eschewed in favor of newer, younger fans attracted to their more recent output. These early songs had already been released in live format on Sweatin' to the Oldies 13 years earlier, so the band also felt that it would be redundant to rehash that part of their past.

The DVD contains numerous bonus features including band member commentaries (Escalante, Fitzgerald and singer Dave Quackenbush), a photo gallery, hidden bonus footage, English subtitles, links to additional online content, and a "Josh Freese Cam" option that allows the viewer to switch the camera angle at any time during the concert to one focusing directly on drummer Josh Freese, with a picture-in-picture display of his foot pedal.

Track listing

Personnel
Dave Quackenbush – vocals
Warren Fitzgerald – guitar, backing vocals
Joe Escalante – bass, backing vocals
Josh Freese – drums

Album information
Record label: Kung Fu Records, Kung Fu Films
Recorded live at the House of Blues in Anaheim, California on July 5, 2003

The Vandals albums
2004 live albums
Kung Fu Records live albums
Albums recorded at the House of Blues